Muhammad Zahab (died 2018) was an Australian math teacher who recruited many of his relatives, friends and acquaintances to join him in Daesh occupied Syria.  The Australian Broadcasting Corporation public affairs show Four Corners reported he recruited his wife, parents, his two brothers, his sister, three cousins, four in-laws, and their children.

Four Corners reported that Zahab rose to a leadership role in Daesh.  Australian security officials considered him the most senior member of the Daesh leadership from Australia.

Zahab married his first wife Mariam Raad, in Australia.  He married a second wife, Zahra Ahmad, after he arrived in Syria.  Ahmad, came from another family which traveled to Daesh territory.

References

2018 deaths
Australian bigamists